In Riemannian geometry, Gromov's optimal stable 2-systolic inequality is the inequality

 ,

valid for an arbitrary Riemannian metric on the complex projective space, where the optimal bound is attained
by the symmetric Fubini–Study metric, providing a natural geometrisation of quantum mechanics.  Here  is the stable 2-systole, which in this case can be defined as the infimum of the areas of rational 2-cycles representing the class of the complex projective line  in 2-dimensional homology.

The proof of Gromov's inequality relies on the Wirtinger inequality for exterior 2-forms.

Projective planes over division algebras 

In the special case n=2, Gromov's inequality becomes . This inequality can be thought of as an analog of Pu's inequality for the real projective plane . In both cases, the boundary case of equality is attained by the symmetric metric of the projective plane. In other words, the manifold  admits Riemannian metrics with higher systolic ratio  than for its symmetric metric .

See also
Loewner's torus inequality
Pu's inequality
Gromov's inequality (disambiguation)
Gromov's systolic inequality for essential manifolds
Systolic geometry

References

Geometric inequalities
Differential geometry
Riemannian geometry
Systolic geometry